Trnava pri Laborci is a village and municipality in Michalovce District in the Kosice Region of eastern Slovakia.

History
In historical records the village was first mentioned in 1249.

Geography
The village lies at an altitude of 176 metres and covers an area of 15.939 km².
It has a population of about 540 people.

Ethnicity
The population is about 97% Slovak and 3% Gipsy in ethnicity.

Culture
The village has a small public library

Infrastructure
The village has a grocery shop.

Transport
The village is accessible via regular bus lines.

The nearest railway station is 24 kilometres away at Michalovce.

Gallery

External links

http://www.statistics.sk/mosmis/eng/run.html

Villages and municipalities in Michalovce District